McGlennon is a surname of Irish origin. Notable people with the surname include:

Cornelius Augustine McGlennon (1878–1931), American politician
Felix McGlennon (1856–1943), British songwriter
John McGlennon (born 1949), American politician

See also
McClennon

Surnames of Irish origin